St. Mark's Episcopal Church, is an historic Carpenter Gothic Episcopal church located today at 212 North Church Street in Starke, Bradford County, Florida. Designed by Fernandina architect Robert S. Schuyler, it was built as All Saints Episcopal Church in 1880 some 20 miles to the south in Fairbanks in Alachua County on land donated by Fernandina attorney, George Fairbanks, who founded Fairbanks. After disastrous freezes in the 1890s destroyed the Fairbanks citrus groves, membership in All Saints declined and the church was closed. In 1900 it was moved to its present location and renamed St. Marks. All that remains of All Saints in Fairbanks today  is its overgrown cemetery.

In 1989 St. Mark's was listed in A Guide to Florida's Historic Architecture, published by the University of Florida Press.

Today St. Mark's is an active parish in the Episcopal Diocese of Florida. Its rector is the Rev. Dennis O'Neill.

References

External links

 St. Mark's Episcopal Church website
 Alachua County Genealogical Society's Virtual Cemetery Project: All Saints Cemetery
 All Saints Episcopal Church Cemetery at Find a Grave

Churches in Alachua County, Florida
Churches in Bradford County, Florida
Episcopal church buildings in Florida
Carpenter Gothic church buildings in Florida
Relocated buildings and structures in Florida
Churches completed in 1880
19th-century Episcopal church buildings
1880 establishments in Florida